Iulian Minea (born 6 December 1969) is a Romanian former football midfielder. His brother, Daniel was also a professional footballer, they played together at Steaua Bucureşti.

Honours
Mecanică Fină Bucureşti
Divizia C: 1988–89
Steaua Bucureşti
Cupa României: 1991–92

References

1969 births
Living people
Romanian footballers
Romania under-21 international footballers
Association football midfielders
Liga I players
Liga II players
ASA Târgu Mureș (1962) players
FC Argeș Pitești players
Faur București players
FC Steaua București players
FCM Câmpina players
Bontang F.C. players
Romanian expatriate footballers
Romanian expatriate sportspeople in Indonesia
Expatriate footballers in Indonesia
Footballers from Bucharest